A designated player may refer to:

Designated Player Rule, a Major League Soccer rule for players over the salary cap
Designated player (NBA), a National Basketball Association exemption for contract extensions
Designated player (softball), a softball batter

See also
 Designated hitter
 Franchise player